The 1983 Tennessee Volunteers football team (variously "Tennessee", "UT" or the "Vols") represented the University of Tennessee in the 1983 NCAA Division I-A football season. Playing as a member of the Southeastern Conference (SEC), the team was led by head coach Johnny Majors, in his seventh year, and played their home games at Neyland Stadium in Knoxville, Tennessee. They finished the season with a record of nine wins and three losses (9–3 overall, 4–2 in the SEC) and a victory over Maryland in the Florida Citrus Bowl. The Volunteers offense scored 282 points while the defense allowed 165 points.

Schedule

Roster

Team players drafted into the NFL
The following players were selected in the 1984 NFL Draft:

References:

The following players were selected in the 1984 NFL Supplemental Draft:

References:

References

Tennessee
Tennessee Volunteers football seasons
Citrus Bowl champion seasons
Tennessee Volunteers football